= Thermus Butler =

Canadian football player

Profile
- Position: Fullback

Personal information
- Born: March 20, 1947 (age 79); Columbus, Georgia, US
- Listed height: 6 ft 1 in (1.85 m)
- Listed weight: 190 lb (86 kg)

Career information
- College: Kansas

Career history
- 1968–1969: Edmonton Eskimos

Thermus Butler (born March 20, 1947) is an American-born Canadian football player who played for the Edmonton Eskimos. He previously played football at the University of Kansas.

== Education ==
High School: George Washington Carver (Columbus, GA)

College: Kansas [1965fr 1966L 1967L]
